KULE (730 AM) is a radio station broadcasting a Regional Mexican format. Licensed to Ephrata, Washington, United States, the station is currently owned by Centro Familiar Cristiano.

Bustos Media used to own the station. In September 2010, Bustos transferred most of its licenses to Adelante Media Group as part of a settlement with its lenders.

Effective December 10, 2014, Bustos Media repurchased KULE from Adelante Media, along with eight other stations and a translator, for $6 million.

Effective February 8, 2019, Bustos Media sold KULE, two sister stations, and a translator to Centro Familiar Cristiano for $374,500. Shortly thereafter, KULE flipped to a Spanish format.

References

External links

ULE (AM)
News and talk radio stations in the United States
Mass media in Grant County, Washington